Curtley-Jack White (born 19 February 1992) is an English cricketer. He made his first-class debut on 1 August 2020, for Northamptonshire in the 2020 Bob Willis Trophy. He made his List A debut on 28 July 2021, for Northamptonshire in the 2021 Royal London One-Day Cup. In July 2022, during the 2022 County Championship match against Lancashire, White took his maiden five-wicket haul in first-class cricket.

References

External links
 

1992 births
Living people
Sportspeople from Kendal
Cricketers from Cumbria
English cricketers
Cumberland cricketers
Cheshire cricketers
Northamptonshire cricketers